Ribera is an deserted village in Álava, Basque Country, Spain.

Geography of Álava